Jinshan can refer to places:

Mainland China
Jinshan District (金山区), Shanghai
Mount Jin (Zhenjiang), mountain in Zhenjiang, Jiangsu
Subdistricts (金山街道)
Jinshan Subdistrict, Fuzhou, in Cangshan District, Fuzhou, Fujian
Jinshan Subdistrict, Xiamen, in Huli District, Xiamen, Fujian
Jinshan Subdistrict, Gaozhou, Guangdong
Jinshan Subdistrict, Meizhou, in Meijiang District, Meizhou, Guangdong
Jinshan Subdistrict, Chaozhou, in Xiangqiao District, Chaozhou, Guangdong
Jinshan Subdistrict, Fuquan, Guizhou
Jinshan Subdistrict, Yichun, Heilongjiang, in Jinshantun District, Yichun, Heilongjiang
Jinshan Subdistrict, Hebi, in Qibin District, Hebi, Henan
Jinshan Subdistrict, Daye, Hubei
Jinshan Subdistrict, Zhuzhou, in Hetang District, Zhuzhou, Hunan
Jinshan Subdistrict, Zhenjiang, in Runzhou District, Zhenjiang, Jiangsu
Jinshan Subdistrict, Xuzhou, in Quanshan District, Xuzhou, Jiangsu
Jinshan Subdistrict, Benxi, in Mingshan District, Benxi, Liaoning

Towns
Jinshan, Fujin (锦山镇)
Written as "金山镇"
Jinshan, Nanchuan District, Chongqing
Jinshan, Dazu County, Chongqing
Jinshan, Nanjing County, Fujian
Jinshan, Guyang County, Inner Mongolia
Jinshan, Ganyu County, Jiangsu
Jinshan, Dandong, in Yuanbao District, Dandong, Liaoning
Jinshan, Leshan, in Wutongtiao District, Leshan, Sichuan
Jinshan, Luojiang County, Sichuan
Jinshan, Shangli County, Zhejiang
Jinshan Township (disambiguation) (金山乡)

Taiwan
Jinshan District, New Taipei (金山區)

Others
San Francisco, California, in the United States, known in Chinese as "Old Jinshan" ( or )
Melbourne, Australia, known in Chinese as "New Jinshan" (Xīn Jīnshān)
Kingsoft (金山软件), anti-virus software

See also
金山 (disambiguation), for topics that are still written as "金山" but not necessarily romanised to "Jinshan"